Neurotensin receptors are transmembrane receptors that bind the  neurotransmitter neurotensin. Numerous crystal structures have been reported for the neurotensin receptor 1 (NTS1). The third receptor has a single transmembrane domain and is encoded by the  gene.

Ligands

Agonists 

Peptide
 Beta-lactotensin (NTS2)
 JMV-449
 Neurotensin
 Neuromedin N (NTS1 selective)
 PD-149,163 (NTS1 selective, reduced amide bond 8-13 fragment of neurotensin)

Non-peptide
 NTS1 full agonist SRI-9829 
 Partial agonists derived from SR-48692

Antagonists 

 Levocabastine (NTS2 selective, also H1 histamine antagonist)
 SR-48692 (NTS1 selective)
 SR-142948 (unselective, CAS# 184162-64-9)

Biophysical Investigation 
Unusually for GPCRs, NTS1 can be expressed in an active form in the bacteria E. coli.  It can be purified and analysed in vitro and has been analysed by a number of biophysical techniques such as surface plasmon resonance, FRET and cryo-electron microscopy.
Furthermore, high-resolution crystal structures of NTS1 have been determined in complex with the peptide full agonist NT8-13, the non-peptide full agonist SRI-9829, the partial agonist RTI-3a, and the antagonists / inverse agonists SR-48692 and SR-142948, as well as in the ligand-free apo state

References

External links 

 

G protein-coupled receptors